Doug Fraser (born 8 May 1992) is a Canadian professional rugby union player who currently plays as a wing or centre for Old Glory DC in Major League Rugby (MLR). He also plays for Canada internationally.

He previously played for Austin Elite during the 2019 MLR season.

Club statistics

References

1992 births
Living people
Austin Gilgronis players
BC Bears players
Canadian expatriate rugby union players
Canadian expatriate sportspeople in the United States
Expatriate rugby union players in the United States
People from Ladysmith, British Columbia
Rugby union centres
Rugby union wings
Sportspeople from British Columbia
University of Victoria alumni
Canada international rugby union players
Canadian rugby union players
Old Glory DC players